Jerzy Janeczek (22 March 1944 – 11 July 2021) was a Polish theater and film actor.

Biography 
Janeczek was born in Itzehoe, Schleswig-Holstein, Prussia, Germany. He finished the National Film School in Łódź in its Faculty of Drama.

He performed in theaters in Wrocław, Kalisz, Koszalin and Warsaw. In 1987 he was dismissed from the Dramatic Theater in Warsaw by Zbigniew Zapasiewicz. By the end of the 1980s, Janeczek migrated to the United States, and in 2007 he returned to Poland.

Janeczek died aged 77 in July 2021.

References

External links 
 
 Jerzy Janeczek on filmweb.pl
 Jerzy Janeczek on filmpolski.pl
 Jerzy Janeczek on stopklatka.pl
 Jerzy Janeczek's pictures in the Polish National Film Archives on  „Fototeka”
 Jerzy Janeczek on e-teatr.pl

1944 births
2021 deaths
People from Itzehoe
Łódź Film School alumni
Polish male film actors
Polish male stage actors